Liliya Nikolaevna Konovalova (February 20, 1933, Novosibirsk – November 25, 2015, Moscow) was a Soviet volleyball player, player of the USSR team (1955–1962). Two-time world champion, six-time champion of the USSR. The attacking. (1956).

Performed for WVC Dynamo Moscow (1953–1962). Its composition: champion of the USSR (1953–1955, 1960, 1962), silver medalist of the Union championships (1957 and 1958), winner of the USSR Cup 1953, winner CEV Champions League-1961.

In the USSR national team in official competitions played in the years 1955–1962. Its composition: twice world champion (1956 and 1960), silver medalist of the world championship in 1962, silver medalist of the 1955 Women's European Volleyball Championship.

After finishing playing career he worked as a teacher. She taught Spanish at Moscow State Institute of International Relations.

References

External links
 Чемпионат СССР 1958 года

1933 births
2015 deaths
Sportspeople from Novosibirsk
Soviet women's volleyball players
Honoured Masters of Sport of the USSR